The Kaohsiung Aquas are a Taiwanese professional basketball team based in Kaohsiung City, Taiwan. They have competed in the T1 League since the 2021–22 season, and play their home games at the Kaohsiung Arena. The Aquas became one of the six teams of the inaugural T1 League season.

The Aquas have a copartnership with Kaohsiung Jeoutai Technology, signed multi-players originally play in the team. Jeoutai Tech is a semi-professional basketball team competes in the Super Basketball League (SBL), another league in Taiwan.

On April 17, 2022, The Aquas announced that they would play their playoff home games at Fengshan Gymnasium. On June 4, the Aquas defeated the Taichung Wagor Suns, 3–0, winning the 2021–22 season championship.

Franchise history

2021: Team creation 
On 4 August, the Aquas traded their 1st round pick to New Taipei CTBC DEA for 1.5 million NTD. In the 2021 draft, they drafted I-Shou swingman Su Wen-Ju in the second round.

Home arenas 
 Kaohsiung Arena (2021–present) 
 Fengshan Gymnasium (2022)

Current roster 

<noinclude>

Personnel

General managers

Head coaches

Season-by-season record

Notable players 
Local players
  Hu Long-Mao (胡瓏貿) – Chinese Taipei men's national basketball team player, T1 League Finals MVP (2022)
  Li Han-Sheng (李漢昇) – Chinese Taipei men's national basketball team player
  Lin Jen-Hung (林任鴻) – Chinese Taipei men's national basketball team player
  Wu I-Ping (吳怡斌) – Chinese Taipei men's national basketball team player
  Wu Siao-Jin (吳曉謹) – Chinese Taipei men's national basketball team player
  Yu Huan-Ya (于煥亞) – Chinese Taipei men's national basketball team player
Type-III players
  Jason Brickman – ABL Finals MVP (2016), TBL MVP (2018)
Import players
  Xavier Alexander – TBL MVP (2019)
  John Bohannon – Jordan men's national basketball team player

References

External links 
 
  
  
 

 
T1 League teams
2021 establishments in Taiwan
Basketball teams established in 2021
Sport in Kaohsiung